The Hyundai i40 is a large family car designed primarily for the European market by the South Korean manufacturer Hyundai between 2011 and 2019. Sharing its platform with the Hyundai Sonata, the i40 sedan was unveiled at the 2011 Barcelona Motor Show.

Overview
The car was designed at Hyundai's European R&D facilities in Rüsselsheim, Germany. It is manufactured at the Ulsan plant in South Korea.

The i40 is described as featuring Hyundai's 'fluidic sculpture' design language, and was launched in Europe initially as an estate/wagon (marketed as the i40 Tourer) with a saloon was due in 2011. The boot space is 553 litres, increasing to 1,719 litres with the rear seats folded down.

In some markets, the Sonata remains on sale as a separate model, such as the United States, where the i40 is unavailable. The estate/wagon variant of the i40 was released in Europe and South Korea in September 2011, followed by the sedan variant in January 2012, and it is also sold in Australia and New Zealand.

For Malaysia, Hyundai launched the i40 at the 2013 Kuala Lumpur International Motor Show, in both sedan and tourer specifications. It is placed above the Hyundai Sonata. The engine is the two litre GDI motor which is linked to a paddle shifted six speed automatic gearbox.

Due to slowing sales of mid-sized cars worldwide, the i40 was discontinued in markets such as Australia and New Zealand in early 2019, leaving the Sonata to cater for the segment. The i40 has since been discontinued in Europe in 2019.

Powertrain
Depending on market, up to three engines are available from a total of four, a 1.7 L diesel in two states of tune (114 bhp and 134 bhp) and three petrol units 1.6 L (133 bhp) and 2.0 L (175 bhp) GDI or a 2.0L (164 bhp) MPi petrol unit. A 'BlueDrive' option includes Intelligent Stop & Go (ISG) start-stop system and 16 inch rolling resistance tyres, resulting in a reduced  of 113g/km for the  diesel.

Safety
Euro NCAP test results for a LHD, five door hatchback variant on a registration from 2011:

Marketing
Hyundai supplied the i40 estate for use in the 2011 FIFA Beach Soccer World Cup.

Awards
The Hyundai i40 won the 2011 Eurocarbody Golden Award.

Notes

References

External links

 (Sedan)

I40
Euro NCAP large family cars
Mid-size cars
Sedans
Station wagons
Taxi vehicles
Cars introduced in 2011
2010s cars